The Windblown Hare is a Warner Bros. Looney Tunes animated short directed by Robert McKimson. The short was released on August 27, 1949, and stars Bugs Bunny. The title, another pun on "hair", refers to Bugs being subjected to the Wolf's "blowing the houses down".

Plot
The Three Little Pigs, reading their own story in a book of fairy tales, decide to circumvent the plot by selling both the straw house and the wooden house before the Wolf can blow them down.

Bugs is easily conned into buying the straw house for ten dollars (a sawbuck). Along comes the Wolf, also reading the book. As per the plot, he blows down the straw house just as homeowner Bugs starts to greet him.

Bugs then buys the wooden house from the second pig, and the three then hole up in the brick house – knowing from the book that the Wolf cannot blow it down. Along comes the Wolf again, book in hand, and blows down the wooden house over Bugs' objections. That prompts the Bunny to deliver payback to the Wolf.

To get revenge on the Wolf, Bugs dresses up as Little Red Riding Hood and skips down the roadway. He meets the Wolf sitting under a tree, reading the end of the story. The Wolf asks the "girl" where she is going and Bugs flips the Wolf's book a few pages. The Wolf then speed-reads "Little Red Riding Hood" until he realizes that he is behind schedule for that story.

The Wolf races over to Grandma's house but rather than eat her, he kicks her out of the house with barely enough time to get her nightclothes on. The Rabbit in Red arrives shortly thereafter. When Bugs Bunny says what big eyes, ears, teeth, and feet the wolf has when he is in Grandma's clothing, he pokes both of the wolf's eyes, pulls his ears up and down, and pulls out his teeth and shoves them back in his mouth. The Wolf retaliates by pulling on Bugs' ears, but Bugs counters that by stepping on the Wolf's foot. After both of them strip each other's disguises they argue, with Bugs exclaiming, "Why, Granny! You're just a wolf in cheap clothing!"

Bugs then refuses to give the Wolf the "present" he brought him. After the Wolf begs Bugs to give him his present, Bugs relents and puts the present (a cake) right into the Wolf's face, telling the Wolf "you asked for it!". Pursued down the basement steps of Grandma's house, Bugs turns off the light switch downstairs, making the Wolf go back to the upstairs switch to restore the light rather than risk Bugs' counterattack. After this procedure is repeated once, Bugs tricks the Wolf by saying "click" instead of actually turning off the light, prompting the Wolf to go back upstairs, automatically turn the upstairs light off and continue down the stairs, allowing Bugs to hit him.

Bugs tries to escape on a bicycle, but it turns out to be a triple-tandem bike with the Wolf in the third seat. Bugs steers into a clothesline, yanking the Wolf out of the seat. When Bugs chides the Wolf for blowing his houses down, the Wolf explains those are the Pigs' houses and that he is doing what the story says. Bugs then sees what is going on.

Arriving at the brick house, Bugs sees the pigs playing cards and gloating about them cheating him into buying their houses. Realizing he was swindled by them intentionally, Bugs directs the Wolf to blow it down. The Wolf says he cannot because the book says so. In his best Brooklynese, Bugs tells him "Book, schnook!  Blow da house down!". The pigs laugh as the wolf blows, and then the house suddenly blows up. The Wolf says, "I did it!"  The pigs look at him in surprise and ask, "He did it?!" The scene pans to Bugs, who pats a TNT detonator, says "Eh, we did it!", and laughs smugly as the cartoon irises out.

Additional crew
Film Edited by: Treg Brown
Uncredited Orchestration by: Milt Franklyn

Home media
The Windblown Hare is available on Looney Tunes Golden Collection: Volume 3 DVD.

References

External links

 
 

1949 films
1949 short films
1949 animated films
1940s Warner Bros. animated short films
Looney Tunes shorts
American parody films
Fairy tale parody films
Films directed by Robert McKimson
Animated films about rabbits and hares
Films about pigs
Animated films about wolves
Films based on fairy tales
Films based on Little Red Riding Hood
Films based on The Three Little Pigs
Films scored by Carl Stalling
Bugs Bunny films
Big Bad Wolf
1940s English-language films